The 1940 New Jersey gubernatorial election was held on November 5, 1940. Democratic nominee Charles Edison defeated Republican nominee Robert C. Hendrickson with 51.38% of the vote.

Primary elections
Primary elections were held on May 21, 1940.

Democratic primary

Candidates
Charles Edison, former United States Secretary of the Navy

Results

Republican primary

Candidates
Robert C. Hendrickson, State Senator for Gloucester County from Woodbury
Harold G. Hoffman, former Governor

Results

General election

Candidates
Major party candidates
Charles Edison, Democratic
Robert C. Hendrickson, Republican

Other candidates
Marion Douglas, Socialist Party of America
Manuel Cantor, Communist Party USA
John C. Butterworth, Socialist Labor Party of America
Elmo L. Bateman, Prohibition Party

Results

References

1940
New Jersey
Gubernatorial
November 1940 events